Orlando Wells (born 9 June 1973) is an English actor and writer.

Career
As an actor, Wells is best known for starring as Alex Stanton in the Channel 4 drama As If, and playing Irwin in Alan Bennett's History Boys.

Wells has written five original plays: The Winter Room (RSC fringe festival), Cold Enough, The Tin Horizon (Theatre 503), The Woodcutter's Tale (developed with NT Studio), and Four Days in Hong Kong (about Glenn Greenwald's and Laura Poitras's first meeting with Edward Snowden), produced as part of the Orange Tree Theatre Festival 2014.

Michael Billington wrote in The Guardian of The Tin Horizon, 'a play that proves Wells has a gift for gothic futurism... a name to watch... shows a wild imagination at work and displays unmistakable signs of talent.'

Wells revised and adapted Patrick Hamilton's The Duke in Darkness for a 2013 production at the Tabard Theatre, Chiswick, directed by Phoebe Barran. The following year Wells co-wrote, with Opera Erratica director Patrick Eakin Young, the libretto for the experimental opera Triptych, performed in 2014 at The Print Room and Wilton's Music Hall.

He was a series-writer for the animated children programs Xolight and Noksu. He has written the full-length feature Bait the Hook, and a short film, Shrike, longlisted for Channel 4's Coming Up.

Personal life
He is the son of actress Susannah York and Michael Wells, and is married with four children.

Selected credits

Theatre
Abigail's Party (2022) as Lawrence Moss (Watford Palace Theatre).
This House (2016 - 2018 stage play, Chichester Festival Theatre, the Garrick Theatre, London, and tour) as an ensemble cast member playing various characters including John Stonehouse and Alan Clark
Noises Off (2016, ETT, Nottingham Playhouse) as Lloyd Dallas, the director
Tonight at 8.30 (2014, stage play, ETT/ Nuffield) as Christian in The Astonished Heart, Jasper in Family Album, Mr Wadhurst in Hands Across the Sea, Murdoch in Ways and Means, Stanley in Still Life, George in Shadow Play and Major Blake in We Were Dancing
The Turn of the Screw (2013, stage play, The Almeida) as Sackville
The Woman in Black (2010, stage play, Fortune Theatre) as The Actor
Katrina (2009, stage play, The Bargehouse, South Bank) as Larry
Our Country's Good (2009, stage play, The Watermill) as Lieutenant Ralph Clark
The History Boys (2006–07, stage play, RNT) as Irwin
Pirandello's Henry IV (2004, stage play, Donmar Warehouse) as Count Di Nolli
A Midsummer Night's Dream (2003, stage play, The Crucible) as Demetrius
The Modernists (2003, stage play, The Crucible) as Clifford
The Tempest (2002, stage play, Thelma Holt) as Ferdinand
A Midsummer Night's Dream (1999-2000, stage play, RSC) as Flute
Othello (1999-2000, stage play, RSC)
Anthony and Cleopatra (1999-2000, stage play, RSC) as the Messenger

TV and film

A Spy Among Friends (2021, ITV) as Michael Straight
Spotify Untold (2021, Netflix) as Peter Thiel
Grantchester (2020, ITV) as Hugo Drinkwater

 Father Brown (2018, BBC) as Eugene Cornelius

Casualty (2015, BBC)
Doctors (2010/ 12/ 14, BBC)
Holby City (2010, BBC)
The King's Speech (2010, See Saw Films) as The Duke of Kent
Nowhere Left to Hide (2009, Blast Films)
A Very British Sex Scandal (2007, TV drama-documentary) as Edward (Lord) Montagu
Midsummer Madness (2007, feature film) as Curt
The Great San Francisco Earthquake (2006, Blast Films) as James
Slave Dynasty (2006, BBC) as William Beckford
Trust (BBC, 2005) as Charles Drinkwater
As If (2001–04, TV series) as Alex Stanton
A Rather English Marriage (1998, TV movie) as Dogleg
After the War (1987, TV series) as a child
The Ploughman's Lunch (1983, Channel 4 TV film) from a screenplay by Ian McEwen
Maurice (1987, Merchant Ivory Productions) as the young Maurice

References

External links

1973 births
20th-century English male actors
21st-century English male actors
Alumni of the London Academy of Music and Dramatic Art
Alumni of the University of Oxford
British expatriate male actors in Australia
English expatriates in Australia
English male child actors
English male film actors
English male Shakespearean actors
English male stage actors
English male television actors
Living people
Male actors from Kent
Royal Shakespeare Company members